The Louth Minor Football Championship is an annual competition organised by Louth GAA between the premier teams in minor (under-17) Gaelic football in County Louth.

Trophy
The winning team is presented with the Father Larry Murray Cup, named after the Louth priest who was a dedicated promoter  of underage football and the Irish language.

The Ulster Minor Football Championship and Leinster Minor Football Championship trophies are also named in his honour, as is Pairc Uí Mhuirí in Dunleer (where Murray served as Parish priest), home to the Lannléire club.

He trained the Louth minor team from 1934 - 41, a very successful period 
for the county during which two All-Ireland Minor Football Championship titles were won.

Finals

 Title awarded to Shamrocks on appeal

See also

References

External Links
 Louth GAA official website
 Louth on Hoganstand

Louth GAA club championships
Gaelic football County Championships
Gaelic football in County Louth